

Offseason
 July 16: Lisa Chesson, a former defenseman for Ohio State, has been invited to the 2009 USA Hockey Women's National Festival, Aug. 18–24 in Blaine, Minn. The National Team will compete in the Qwest Tour, a 10-game domestic tour that begins Sept. 25 and ends just prior to the start of the 2010 Olympic Winter Games in Vancouver, British Columbia.
 July 29: Ohio State women's hockey forward Laura McIntosh has managed to step away from the ice this summer. McIntosh is the third baseman for Team Ontario, made up of the best softball players in the province. The Waterloo native, who led the Buckeyes in points during her freshman season last year, is the only college-aged member of the team who doesn't play college softball.
 August 17: Natalie Spooner, earned a place on Canada's National Women's Under-22 Team for the second time in as many years.
 August 31: Four Buckeyes are on the top international teams in women's hockey are gathered in Vancouver, British Columbia. They will compete for the 2009 Hockey Canada Cup beginning Monday, with the gold medal game Sunday, Sept. 6. Three of the Buckeyes are former Ohio State defensemen: Tessa Bonhomme on Team Canada, Lisa Chesson on Team USA and Emma Laaksonen on Team Finland. Incoming freshman forward Minttu Tuominen is on Team Finland. The Hockey Canada Cup is being used as a test event for the Games.
 September 9: The WCHA announced that Ohio State defenseman Shannon Reilly and forwards Laura McIntosh and Natalie Spooner have been named as WCHA All-Stars. The three players are among 22 players from the conference to face the 2009-10 U.S Women's National Team in St. Paul, Minn. on September 25.

Exhibition

Schedule

Regular season
 November 7: The Buckeyes moved into second place in the Western Collegiate Hockey Association standings after defeating North Dakota by a score of 3-1 at the Ralph Engelstad Arena.
 December 17:Lisa Chesson, a defenseman for the Ohio State women's hockey team from 2005-08, has been named to the U.S. Olympic Women's Team.
 December 22: Former Buckeye All-American Tessa Bonhomme, a defenseman for Ohio State from 2004-08, has been nominated to the Canadian National Women's Team for the 2010 Winter Olympic Games announced.

Standings

Roster

Schedule

Player performances
 In her junior season, Christina Mancuso had a career highs in points with ten (four goals and six assists). Nine of her points were against WCHA opponents (three goals, six assists). The Buckeyes won seven of the eight games in which Mancuso had a point . On October 16, Mancuso had the first multiple-point game of her career with two assists in 5-2 win at Bemidji State. The first shorthanded goal of her career was scored against the Robert Morris Colonials on January 2. January 15 was her second multi-point game as she scored a goal and assist in 6-0 shutout at Minnesota State.
 As a sophomore, Laura McIntosh played in all 37 games and led the team with 35 assists. It was the second-highest total in a season by a Buckeye. The 35 assists also led the entire WCHA. Her 45 points ranked second on the team in pointsShe had 11 multiple-point games and eight contests with multiple assists . On the power play, McIntosh collected 18 points, including 16 assists, for the second-most power play points on the Buckeyes . McIntosh carried an eight-game point streak into the 2010-11 season . In the NCAA, she ranked fifth in assists per game (0.95) and 19th in points per game (1.22). In WCHA conference games, her 37 points tied for third. In the first five games of the season, McIntosh had four assists. She factored into all three goals in 5-3 loss at Wisconsin on October 24. On October 30–31, the Buckeyes swept Minnesota State and McIntosh had a five-point series (1 goal, 4 assists).

Player stats

Skaters

Postseason
In the first game of the WCHA playoffs, Natalie Spooner scored all three goals for Ohio State. In the next game, Raelyn LaRocque would score the overtime winner as Ohio State swept Wisconsin.

WCHA playoffs

Awards and honors

Preseason honors
 WCHA Preseason Player of the year finalist: Natalie Spooner, Ohio State
 WCHA Preseason Rookie of the year finalist: Hokey Langan, Ohio State

Regular season honors
 Chelsea Knapp, WCHA Defensive Player of the Week (Week of January 4)
 Raelyn LaRocque, WCHA Offensive Player of the Week (Week of November 9)
 Hokey Langan, WCHA Rookie of the Week (Week of November 2)
 Hokey Langan, WCHA Rookie of the Week (Week of January 25)
 Hokey Langan, WCHA Rookie of the Week (Week of February 17, 2010)
 Hokey Langan, WCHA Freshman of the Year
 Hokey Langan, WCHA Scoring Champion
 Natalie Spooner, WCHA Offensive Player of the Week (Week of January 20)
 Minttu Tuominen, WCHA Rookie of the Week (Week of October 19)

Post season honors
 Rachel Davis, 2010 Frozen Four Skills Competition participant
 Hokey Langan, Patty Kazmaier Award nominee
 Natalie Spooner, Patty Kazmaier Award nominee
 Kelly Wild, Big Ten Sportsmanship Award for the team (2009–10)

Academic honors
 Kelly Wild, WCHA All-Academic Team (2009–10)
 Kelly Wild, Academic All-Big Ten at-large selection (2009–10)
 Kelly Wild, Ohio State Scholar-Athlete (2009–10)

All-WCHA Team
 Natalie Spooner, All-WCHA First Team

Team awards
 Most Valuable Offensive player, Natalie Spooner
 Most Valuable Defensive player, Rachel Davis
 Most Valuable Freshman, Hokey Langan
 Most Improved Player, Paige Semenza
 Seventh Player award, Raelyn LaRocque
 Scarlet and Gray award, Raelyn LaRocque
 Team Academic award, Barbara Bilko
 Buckeye Power Club, Christina Mancuso

See also
 2009–10 Ohio State Buckeyes women's basketball team

References

External links
 Official site

Ohio State
Ohio State Buckeyes women's ice hockey seasons
Ohio State Buckeyes
Ohio State Buckeyes